Kaleem Siddiqui (born 23 September 1957) is an Indian Islamic scholar, preacher, educationist and a prominent member of Tablighi Jamaat. He was detained by ATS of Up police with accusations of mass conversion which nationalist Hindu considered a threat to their religion, he had been providing both financial and legal  assistance to those who faced difficulty to adopt Islam as their consent religion. He is a disciple of Muhammad Zakariyya al-Kandhlawi and Abul Hasan Ali Hasani Nadwi. Aapki Amanat Aapki Sewa Mein is one of his popular book.

Biography 
Kaleem Siddiqui was born on 23 September 1957 in Phulat village of Muzaffarnagar district, Uttar Pradesh, India. His father Haji Muhammad Amin was a Zamindar and murid of Mahmud Hasan Deobandi. His mother's name is Zubaida Khatun. He was educated at the Faizul Islam Madrasa in phulat, founded by Rashid Ahmad Gangohi, now known as Jamia Imam Wali Ullah. In class V, he memorized first 7 Para of Quran. He passed his higher secondary in science from Pact Inter College. He completed his BSc from Meerut College. He then appeared for the All India Pre Medical Test and finished 57th across India. He later came in contact with Abul Hasan Ali Hasani Nadwi and was admitted to Darul Uloom Nadwatul Ulama to study Islamic subjects. He did not get admission even after getting the opportunity to get admission in MBBS.

Books 
His most popular book is Aapki Amanat Aapki Sewa Mein. His other books include:
Hume Hidayat Kaise Mili
Dawat E Deen : Kuch Ghalat Fahmiyaan Kuch Haqaaiq
Hadiya Dawat
Tohfah Dawat
Dawat Fikr O Amal
Armughaan E Dawat
Usway Nabi E Rahmat Aur Hamaari Zindagi
Rafeeq Bano Fareeq Nahi
Har Marz Ki Dawa Hai Sallay A’laa Muhammad
Deeni Madaris Aur Hamaari Zimmaydaariyaan
Naseem Hidayat Kay Jhokay

References 

1957 births
Living people
Indian Islamic religious leaders
Scholars from Uttar Pradesh
21st-century Muslim theologians
Muslim apologists
20th-century Muslim theologians
21st-century Indian Muslims
21st-century Muslim scholars of Islam
Critics of Hinduism
Hanafis
Deobandis
Darul Uloom Nadwatul Ulama alumni
Disciples of Abul Hasan Ali Hasani Nadwi